Maurice Martens (born 5 June 1947 in Aalst) was a Belgian football player, left-back, who won the Belgian Golden Shoe in 1973 while at Racing White. He played 26 times and scored 2 goals for the national team between 1971 and 1980, starting in a 1–0 friendly win against Luxembourg on 7 November 1971. Having been a non-playing squad member at the 1970 World Cup. Martens was part of the team for the 1972 and 1980 European Championships but he did not play a match in the latter. He was transferred from Anderlecht to Racing White in the summer of 1970.
Competed on T.V.'s Superstars in 1976 ( G.B. heat -7th ). He owned a sports shop whilst at R.W.D.

Honours

Player 
RSC Anderlecht

 Belgian First Division: 1967–68
 Inter-Cities Fairs Cup 1969-70 (runners-up)

RWD Molenbeek 

 Belgian First Division: 1974–75
 Amsterdam Tournament: 1975
 Jules Pappaert Cup: 1975

International

Belgium 

 UEFA European Championship: 1972 (third place)
 UEFA European Championship: 1980 (runners-up)
 Belgian Sports Merit Award: 1980

Individual 

 Belgian Golden Shoe: 1973

 Man of the Season (Belgian First Division): 1972–73

References

External links

1947 births
Living people
Sportspeople from Aalst, Belgium
Footballers from East Flanders
Belgian footballers
Belgium international footballers
Belgian Pro League players
R.S.C. Anderlecht players
R.W.D. Molenbeek players
1970 FIFA World Cup players
UEFA Euro 1972 players
UEFA Euro 1980 players
Association football defenders